Settled Out of Court is a 1960 comedy thriller play by William Saroyan and Henry Cecil. It appeared at the Strand Theatre in London's West End with a cast including Nigel Patrick, Maxine Audley, Charles Heslop, Eric Pohlmann, John Stratton, Philip Guard and Mary Hignett. Patrick also directed the work.

Adapted from Cecil's own 1959 novel Settled Out of Court, the whole play takes place in the study of a high court judge Sir George Halliday. Although it received very poor reviews from critics, it was a popular success and ran for nearly a year.

References

Bibliography
 Amnon Kabatchnik. Blood on the Stage, 1950-1975: Milestone Plays of Crime, Mystery, and Detection. Scarecrow Press, 2011.

1960 plays
British plays
West End plays
Plays by William Saroyan
Plays set in England
comedy plays
Thriller plays